Blairgowrie may refer to:

 Blairgowrie, Perth and Kinross, a town in Scotland now part of the burgh of Blairgowrie and Rattray
 Blairgowrie, Victoria, Australia
 Blairgowrie, Gauteng, South Africa